Grant Hedger (Bondi, New South Wales) is an Australian former professional rugby league footballer who played in the 1970s. He played in Australia's major competition - the New South Wales Rugby League (NSWRL).

Hedger played for the Eastern Suburbs club, progressing through the lower grades he made his 1st grade debut in 1975. The hard working Rugby league Forward played in 36 matches for the Eastern Suburbs Roosters in the years 1975–78. During the 1976 NSWRFL season, Hedger played in the forwards to help Eastern Suburbs claim victory in their unofficial 1976 World Club Challenge match against British champions St. Helens in Sydney.

During his first season Hedger was a member of Easts' premiership winning side that defeated St George by a record 38-0 margin.

References
 The Encyclopedia Of Rugby League Players; Alan Whiticker & Glen Hudson

Australian rugby league players
Sydney Roosters players
Living people
Year of birth missing (living people)
Rugby league players from Sydney
Rugby articles needing expert attention